Prince Albert Sound (Inuit: Kangiryuak) is a Northern Canadian body of water located in the Inuvik Region of southwestern Victoria Island,  Northwest Territories. It is an inlet of Amundsen Gulf. The sound separates the Wollaston Peninsula from the island's central areas. On 14 May 1851, some of Robert McClure's men reached its north side. Ten days later, John Rae (explorer) reached its south side, but the two groups had no contact.

References

Sounds of the Northwest Territories
Victoria Island (Canada)
Sounds of the Arctic Ocean
Geography of the Inuvialuit Settlement Region